The 2019 season was AIK's 128th in existence, their 91st season in Allsvenskan and their 14th consecutive season in the league. The team was competing in Allsvenskan, Svenska Cupen and UEFA Champions League.

Squad

Players out on loan

Transfers

In

Loans in

Out

Loans out

Released

Friendlies

Competitions

Overview

Allsvenskan

League table

Results summary

Results by round

Results

Svenska Cupen

2018–19

Group stage

Knock-out stage

2019–20

UEFA Champions League

Qualifying rounds

UEFA Europa League

Qualifying rounds

Squad statistics

Appearances and goals

|-
|colspan="16"|Players away on loan:

|-
|colspan="16"|Players who appeared for AIK but left during the season:

|}

Goal scorers

Clean sheets

Disciplinary record

References

AIK Fotboll seasons
AIK Fotboll